"Again & Again" is the debut single by American alternative metal band Taproot. The song was released from the band's major label debut, Gift. The single's b-side, "Day by Day", appeared on the album Dracula 2000: Music from the Motion Picture.

Overview
A demo version of the song appears on the album Upon Us.

"Again & Again" was a minor success for the band, charting on the US Main. Rock Chart and UK Singles Chart.

Music video
The song's music video shows the band performing the song in a building, while fans watch the performance on a TV screen.

Track listing

Chart positions

Personnel
 Stephen Richards – vocals, programming
 Mike DeWolf – guitar
 Phil Lipscomb – bass
 Jarrod Montague – drums

References

2000 debut singles
Atlantic Records singles
Taproot (band) songs
Songs written by Stephen Richards (musician)
2000 songs